Arnold Beck (15 January 1949 – 10 July 2014) was a Liechtensteiner alpine skier who competed in the 1968 Winter Olympics.

References

External links
 

1949 births
2014 deaths
Liechtenstein male alpine skiers
Olympic alpine skiers of Liechtenstein
Alpine skiers at the 1968 Winter Olympics